Mian Altaf M. Saleem is a Pakistani businessman who is the founder of Shakarganj Limited and its philanthropic arm Shakarganj Foundation. Previously, he has served as the Chairman of Sui Northern Gas Pipelines Limited and as a Federal Minister for Privatisation from 1999 to 2002.

Career
In June 2005, he was made Chairman of the Sui Northern Gas Pipelines Limited.

In 2006, the President of Pakistan conferred him with the Sitara-i-Eisaar in recognition of his humanitarian services.

References

Living people
Pakistani industrialists
Federal ministers of Pakistan
Year of birth missing (living people)